The Sigma 50mm 1.4 EX DG HSM is a normal prime lens made by the Sigma Corporation.

The lens is produced in Canon EF mount, Four Thirds System, Nikon F-mount, Pentax K mount, Sigma's own SA mount, and the Sony/Minolta AF Mount varieties, all have the same optical formula.

Technical information
The Sigma 50mm 1.4 EX DG HSM is constructed with a plastic body and a metal mount. This lens features a distance window with depth of field scale. A nine-blade, maximum aperture of 1.4 gives the lens the ability to create shallow depth-of-field effects. The optical construction of this lens contains eight lens elements, including one aspherical lens element. This lens uses a front extension focusing system, powered by a ring USM motor.  Auto-focus speed of the lens is moderate; it is not as fast as most ring USM lenses. The front of the lens does not rotate, but does extend when focusing. The lens is designed so that the outer body barrel is longer than the inner lens barrel, when the inner lens barrel is at its longest extension. This results in the lens maintaining the same overall length no matter where the point of focus lies.

When used on a digital crop body with a field of view compensation factor of 2× (Four Thirds body), it provides a field of view equivalent to a 100 mm lens mounted in a 35 mm body. In a 1.6× body, such as the Canon EOS 7D, it provides a narrower field of view, equivalent to an 80 mm lens mounted on a 35 mm frame body. With a 1.5× body such as the Nikon D300, it provides a less narrow field of view, equivalent to a 75 mm lens mounted on a 35 mm frame body. With a 1.3× body such as the Canon EOS-1D Mark III, it provides an even less narrow field of view, equivalent to a 65 mm lens mounted on a 35 mm frame body.

Advantages & Problems
This lens has shown to have lower vignetting than other Canon 50mm lenses. It has been reported that quality control problems lead to some copies of this lens having problems attaining proper focus when using auto focus.

See also
List of Nikon F-mount lenses with integrated autofocus motors

References

External links

http://www.bythom.com/Sigma-50-HSM-lensreview.htm

050mm f/1.4 EX DG HSM
Camera lenses introduced in 2008